is a private women's college in Sagamihara, Kanagawa Prefecture, Japan.

The predecessor of the school was founded in 1900 in Hongō, Bunkyo-ku, Tokyo, and was the fourth oldest women's college in Japan. It moved to its present location in Sagamihara in 1946 and was chartered as a university in 1949.

References

External links
 Official website 
 

Private universities and colleges in Japan
Universities and colleges in Kanagawa Prefecture
Women's universities and colleges in Japan
Educational institutions established in 1900
Western Metropolitan Area University Association
1900 establishments in Japan